Knik-Fairview is a census-designated place (CDP) in Matanuska-Susitna Borough, Alaska, United States. It is part of the Anchorage, Alaska Metropolitan Statistical Area. At the 2020 census the population was 19,297, up from 14,923 in 2010. It is the most populated CDP in Alaska.

Geography

Demographics

Knik-Fairview first appeared on the 1910 U.S. Census as the unincorporated village of Knik. It appeared again from 1920–40. Knik did not appear again until 1980, when it was classified as a native village with just 10 residents. In 1990, it was reclassified as a census-designated place (CDP). In 2000, it was renamed Knik-Fairview (CDP).

As of the  2000 census, there were 7,050 people, 2,380 households, and 1,800 families residing in the CDP.  The population density was 39/km2 (100/sq mi).  There were 2,590 housing units at an average density of 37/sq mi (14/km2).  The racial makeup of the CDP was 88% white, 6% Native American, and 4% from two or more races.  3% of the population were Hispanic or Latino of any race. Blacks, Asians, and Pacific Islanders all have less than 1%. 1% are from other races.

There were 2,380 households, out of which 45% had children under the age of 18 living with them, 64% were married couples living together, 7% had a female householder with no husband present, and 24% were non-families. 18% of all households were made up of individuals, and 3% had someone living alone who was 65 years of age or older.  The average household size was 3.0 and the average family size was 3.4.

In the CDP, the population was spread out, with 34% under the age of 18, 6% from 18 to 24, 33% from 25 to 44, 23% from 45 to 64, and 5% who were 65 years of age or older.  The median age was 33 years. For every 100 females, there were 108 males.  For every 100 females age 18 and over, there were 107 males.

The median income for a household in the CDP was $52,100, and the median income for a family was $60,100. Males had a median income of $46,300 versus $29,800 for females. The per capita income for the CDP was $20,900.  11% of the population and 9% of families were below the poverty line. 13% of those under the age of 18 and 4% of those 65 and older were living below the poverty line.

References

Anchorage metropolitan area
Census-designated places in Alaska
Census-designated places in Matanuska-Susitna Borough, Alaska
Populated coastal places in Alaska on the Pacific Ocean
Denaʼina